Liolaemus gununakuna is a species of lizard in the family  Liolaemidae. It is native to Argentina.

References

gununakuna
Reptiles described in 2004
Taxa named by Luciano Javier Ávila
Taxa named by Mariana Morando
Taxa named by Jack W. Sites Jr.
Reptiles of Argentina